Birla Tyres, a division of Kesoram Industries Ltd., was first established in 1991. They manufacture tyres for automobiles, motorcycles, commercial vehicles, farm vehicles and heavy earth-moving machinery.

They have over 170 sales depots with more than 491 sales engineers and 8,831 dealers at major locations. New office locations  have come up at Shankagiri, Panvel, Secunderabad, Himatnagar and Siwan.
Birla Tyre's international network stretches across 17 countries worldwide.

History
Birla Tyres was first established in 1991, as part of Kesoram Industries Limited. It then collaborated with tyre manufacturer Pirelli, in the production and development of its tyres.

Products
Birla tyres have a wide range of tyres from motorcycles to farm tractors. The company manufacture bias and radial tyres with over 170 sales depots in India and in the international network across 17 countries worldwide. The company produce Truck & bus tyre, SCV & LCV tyre, Passenger car tyre, Two & Three wheelers tyre, Farm and Mining tyres.

Awards and recognition
 2012: Capexil Special Export Award 2012-13
 2018: Ranked 67th worldwide on the Tire Business Global Top 75 Tire Makers list in 2018.

References 

Tyre manufacturers of India
Manufacturing companies based in Kolkata
Manufacturing companies established in 1991
Indian brands
1991 establishments in West Bengal
Indian companies established in 1991
Companies listed on the National Stock Exchange of India
Companies listed on the Bombay Stock Exchange